Thunder Alley is a 1967 film about auto racing directed by Richard Rush and starring Annette Funicello and Fabian Forte. It was released by American International Pictures.

Plot
A race car driver, Tommy Callahan, retires after a blackout causes the death of another driver on the motorway. After the accident, he begins working at a Pete Madsen's "Thrill Circus" as a stunt driver. There he meets the proprietor's daughter, Francie, who also drives there, and her boyfriend Eddie Sands.

Bored by his new job, Tommy begins training Eddie to be a professional. Eddie picks it up quickly, winning his first race. This leads to Tommy's gold-digging ex-girlfriend Annie Blaine scheming to steal the hot young driver away from Francie.

Despite their quarreling, plus Francie's concern over his previous blackouts, she and Tommy are paired up during a 500-mile race. On the track, Tommy feels another blackout coming on, but manages to hang on. He comes to realize that the fainting spells are a psychological reaction to a childhood trauma.

Francie goads ex-fiance Eddie into reckless maneuvers on the track, causing him to crash. Tommy wins the race, and her as well.

Principal cast

Production
The film was originally known as Malibu 500 and Rebel 500. It was the third of a seven-picture deal between AIP and Fabian.

The director was Richard Rush who had made a number of lower budgeted films. He got the job through his agent, who was married to Annette Funicello at the time. Rush says AIP "were fond of my work.... They were the teenage exploitation studio...  Since I was very rebellious, my characters were always very rebellious, which seemed to be the keynote of American youth at that time. My pictures worked in the marketplace."

AIP was then run by the team of Sam Arkoff and James H NIcholson. Rush says before filming "Sam Arkoff took me aside and said, "Look, [Jim] Nicholson has got this girlfriend, and I don’t want her on the picture." I said that was okay. A while later, Nicholson pulled me aside and said, "Richard, there's this girl I’d like you to use on the picture..."." (It is likely this was Susan Hart.)

Filming began on 1 November 1966.

Rush later said "Fabian turned out to be much better than my expectations. I had that jaundiced view of, "Oh, it's Fabian — a manufactured talent." But he 
wasn't like that; he was a smart kid, worked hard, and was willing to do whatever you asked him to. Annette had poise and great ability, and was a mini-movie star."
 
Rush later said it was one of his few films "that I didn't have any freedom on." He says the main problem was when he was hired the producer Burt Topper had already spent three racing seasons shooting car racing footage.

"They came to me with that part already done. Since it’s a racing film, it didn’t have what I was hoping would be my trademark, even at that early stage. So I never felt it was completely my film. It was like writing the story around the footage."

Rush said, "The part of the film that deals with the actors is mine, and the rest is Burt’s. It sort of divorced me from that sense of proprietorship that I have over all of my other films.

Reception
Contemporary reviews were mediocre. However AIP liked Rush's work and he made two other films for that company, Psych-Out and The Savage Seven.

Quentin Tarantino is an admirer of the film. "Richard Rush is a terrific director and stunt man and I actually used part of the score from this film in the big car chase scene in my movie Death Proof. It’s a real Sixties hard-driving piece of music with bongos and a syntar. That’s really cool."

According to Diabolique magazine:
Thunder Alley is a far more cohesive and successful film than Fireball 500 – a solid drama with a thumping soundtrack... and Annette Funicello is really good – but then it’s a strong role, perhaps her best ever for AIP. Fabian is also strong – cocky, arrogant, but haunted and basically decent; it’s one of his best parts.

Soundtrack
The film features the song "When You Get What You Want" by Guy Hemric and Jerry Styner, performed by Annette Funicello. The duo also wrote the title song "Thunder Alley", performed by The Band Without a Name. The song "Riot in Thunder Alley", by Eddie Beram, from the film also appears in the film and soundtrack album for Death Proof.

See also
List of American films of 1967

References

External links 
 
 
 

1967 films
1960s sports films
American International Pictures films
American auto racing films
American road movies
Films set in Florida
Films shot in Florida
American independent films
Films directed by Richard Rush
American drama films
Films produced by Burt Topper
Beach party films
1960s English-language films
1960s American films